Marsha Hudey  is a Canadian speedskater from White City, Saskatchewan. She skated in the 500 m event at the 2014 Winter Olympics. At the 2007 Canada Winter Games Hudey won two gold medals as a competitor for Saskatchewan.

Career

2018 Winter Olympics
Hudey qualified to compete for Canada at the 2018 Winter Olympics.

References 

1990 births
Canadian female speed skaters
Speed skaters at the 2014 Winter Olympics
Speed skaters at the 2018 Winter Olympics
Speed skaters at the 2022 Winter Olympics
Olympic speed skaters of Canada
Sportspeople from Saskatchewan
Living people